Thediyur (also spelled Tediyur or Thethiyur) is a village in Kudavasal taluk, Tiruvarur district, Tamil Nadu, India.

It is one of the eighteen villages where vAthimALs settled. Located 23 km from Kumbakonam, it has a population of about 3000 people.  The village is well connected by road to Kumbakonam and Mayiladuthurai.  Bus services are available every 30 minutes from Kumbakonam and Mayiladuthurai.

The reason for the village named as Tediyur is as follows. While King Dasaratha of Ayodhya was fighting at the war field, the wheels of his chariot got struck at a place and that place is Tediyur. It is split as thEr - thagarndha - oor (place where the chariot got damaged).

References 

Villages in Tiruvarur district